Frank Rosaly (born 05/30/1974) is a Puerto Rican American drummer, composer, and sound designer associated with a transparent compositional approach to drumming across various styles of music including jazz, improvisation, rock and experimental music. Rosaly also composes for film.

Biography
Frank Rosaly (Francisco Javier Rosaly Amoros) was born in Phoenix, Arizona in 1974.  His mother Carmen (née Amoros) was a secretary, his father Francisco was an accountant. He has one sister Frances who is a teacher. Frank graduated from Thunderbird High School in Phoenix, Arizona in 1992. He subsequently attended Northern Arizona University in Flagstaff, Arizona where he earned a bachelor's degree in Percussion Performance. Starting out in the Flagstaff and Phoenix, Arizona music scenes, Rosaly relocated to Los Angeles for a time before returning to NAU from 1999-2000. It was in this time that Rosaly performed extensively with composer/bassist Joel DiBartolo in Raging Jazz Project which also included future Big Gigantic founder Dominic Lalli. Rosaly studied with Billy Higgins from 1998-1999.

Rosaly relocated to Chicago in 2001 where he was awarded Best Jazz Musician by The Chicago Reader in 2013. In addition to performing and recording within the local scene and groups, Rosaly also produces the solo project “Milkwork: A Study In Integration Of Electronically Manipulated Percussion Instruments”. He also operates his own independent record label called Molk Records.

In 2016, Rosaly relocated to Amsterdam and continues to work with artists and groups in Chicago, New York and other parts of Europe with such groups as OBOL LE and All Ellington.

Discography
Frank Rosaly:
2005 - One And Two (Molk)
2006 - Solo (Molk)
2008 - Puerto Rico (Molk)
2009 - Milkwork (Molk/Contraphonic)
2010 - Live At Experimental Sound Studio 05/30/10 (Molk)
2012 - Centering And Displacement (Utech)
2013 - Cicada Music (Delmark)
2013 - Viscous (Molk)
2015 - Malo (Utech)
2016 - Neolithic Extraction - The Malo Remixes (Utech)

Raging Jazz Project
1999 - Live Somewhere We Used To Know (Self-Released)

Shortbus
1999 - The Full Hookup (DBR, Inc.)

Design Flaw
2003 - Ends Meet (Future Reference)

Thread Quintet
2003 - Long Lines (Future Reference)

Tim Daisy & Frank Rosaly:
2006 - Boombox Babylon (Utech)

Keefe Jackson & Frank Rosaly:
2007 - Duo (Molk)

Dave Rempis/Frank Rosaly
2009 - Cyrillic (482 Music)

Christoph Erb, Fred Lonberg-Holm, Jason Roebke & Frank Rosaly:
2011 - Sack (Veto Recordings)

Jeb Bishop, Jaap Blonk, Lou Mallozzi & Frank Rosaly:
2012 - At The Hideout (Kontrans)

Aram Shelton, Fred Lonberg-Holm & Frank Rosaly:
2015 - Resounder (Singlespeed Music)

Aram Shelton & Frank Rosaly:
2015 - Sticks And Reed

Thurston Moore & Frank Rosaly:
2016 - Marshmallow Moon Decorum (Corbett vs, Dempsey)

Aaron Bennet, Darren Johnston, Lisa Mezzacappa & Frank Rosaly:
2016 - Shipwreck 4 (NoBusiness)

Shane Parish & Frank Rosaly:
2016 - Labrys (Cabin Floor Esoterica)

Fred Jackson, Stéphane Payen, Edward Perrud & Frank Rosaly:
2017 - Twins (The Bridge Sessions)

Christoph Erb, Jim Baker & Frank Rosaly:
2017 - …Don’t Buy Him A Parrot… (hatOLOGY)

Dave Rempis, Jasper Stadhouders & Frank Rosaly:
2018 - ICOCI (Aerophonic)

Tres Hongos:
2012 - Where My Dreams Go To Die (Molk)

The Luzern-Chicago Connection
2012 - Live At Jazzfestival Willisau (Veto)

The Young Mothers
2014 - A Mothers Work Is Never Done (Tektite)
2018 - Morose (Super Secret)

All Ellington
2018 -All Ellington (De Platenbakkerij)

As sideman
With Northern Arizona University Jazz Ensemble
1993 - The Year Of The Cow (Walrus)
1994 - Herding Cats (Sea Breeze Vista)
1996 - Vintage Year (Sea Breeze Vista)
2001 - Sphinx (Sea Breeze Vista)

With Katie Haverly
2003 - The City (Self Released)

With Paul Hartsaw Tentet
2004 - Chicago 2004 (Metastablesound)

With Mandarin Movie
2005 - Mandarin Movie (Aesthetics)

With The Rempis Percussion Quartet
2005 - Circular Logic (Utech)
2006 - Rip Tear Crunch (482 Music)
2007 - Hunter-Gatherers (482 Music)
2009 - The Disappointment Of Parsley (Not Two)
2011 - Montreal Parade (482 Music)
2013 - Phalanx (Aerophonic)
2015 - Cash And Carry (Aerophonic)
2017 - Cochonnerie (Aerophonic)

With Steve Dawson
2005 - Sweet Is The Anchor (Undertow)
2009 - I Will Miss The Trumpets And The Drums (Kernel Sound/Undertow)
2011 - Live At Simon's (Self-Released)
2014 - Funeral Bonsai Wedding (Kernel Sound)

With Subliminal 3
2005 - Decidedly Against Going (Beta:Sound)
2005 - Nervous Center (Beta:Sound)

With Boxhead Ensemble
2006 - Nocturns (Atavistic)

With Fast Citizens
2006 - Ready Everyday (Delmark)
2009 - Two Cities (Delmark)
2012 - Gather (Delmark)

With Matana Roberts
2007 - The Chicago Project (Central Control International)

With Fred Lonberg-Holm Trio
2007 - Terminal Valentine (Atavistic)

With Keefe Jackson's Project Project
2007 - Just Like This (Delmark)

With Who Cares How Long You Sink
2007 - Folk Forms Evaporate Big Sky (Sundmagi)

With Princess, Princess
2007 - Kentucky Princess (Pionic)

With Jason Adasiewicz
2008 - Rolldown (482 Music)
2009 - Varmint (Cuneiform)

With The Flatlands Collective
2008 - Maatjes (Clean Feed)

With Never Enough Hope
2008 - The Gift Economy (Contraphonic)
2015 - The Gravity Of Our Commitment (Milk Factory)

With Musket
2008 - Free Coffee At The Banks/Push My Heavy (Pionic)

With Ingebrigt Håker Flaten Quintet
2008 - The Year Of The Boar (Jazzland)

With David Daniell & Douglas McCombs
2009 - Sycamore (Thrill Jockey)
2012 - Versions (Thrill Jockey)

With Fred Lonberg-Holm's Lightbox Orchestra
2009 - At The Hideout (Kuro Neko)
2009 - At Elastic Arts (Kuro Neko)

With Paul Giallorenzo
2009 - Get In To Go Out (482 Music)

With Jeb Bishop Trio
2009 - 2009 (Better Animal)

With Scorch Trio
2010 - Melaza (Rune Grammofon)
2011 - Made in Norway (Rune Grammofon)

With Josh Abrams
2010 - Natural Information (Eremite)
2013 - Unknown Known (RogueArt)
2014 - Represencing (Eremite)

With Nick Mazzarella Trio
2010 - Aviary (Thought To Sound)
2010 - This Is Only A Test: Live At The Hungry Brain (Sonichla)
2015 - Ultraviolet (International Anthem)
2018 - Counterbalance (Astral Spirits/Monofonus Press/Spacetone)

With Karl E. H. Seigfried
2010 - Portrait Of Jack Johnson (Imaginary Chicago)

With Jorrit Dijkstra
2010 - Pillow Circles (Clean Feed)

With Marketa Irglova
2011 - Anar (ANTI-)

With Joan Of Arc
2011 - Joan Of Arc Present Oh Brother (Joyful Noise Recordings)
2011 - Lightbox (Joyful Noise Recordings)

With Jason Stein Quartet
2011 - The Story This Time (Delmark)

With Boris Hauf Sextet
2011 - Next Delusion (Clean Feed)

With Darren Johnston's Gone To Chicago
2011 - The Big Lift (Porto Franco)

With Ingebrigt Håker Flaten Chicago Sextet
2012 - Live At Jazzfest Saalfelden (Tektite)

With Matt Clark
2012 - Three:four Split Series Vol. 4 (Three:four)

With Josh Berman
2012 - There Now (Delmark)
2015 - A Dance And A Hop (Delmark)

With Iñigo Ugarteburu
2013 - For The Unknown (Foehn/Talo)

With Nicole Mitchell's Ice Crystal
2013 - Aquarius

With Pandelis Karayorgis Quintet
2013 - Circuitous (Driff)
2014 - Afterimage (Driff)

With Devin Hoff
2013 - The Lost Songs Of Lemuria (Self-Released)

With Bradford/Gjerstad Quartet
2014 - Silver Cornet (Nessa)
2015 - The Delaware River (NoBusiness)

With Dave McDonnell Group
2014 - The Dragon And The Griffin (New Atlantis)
2015 - The Time Inside A Year (Delmark)

With Jason Roebke
2014 - Combination (Self-Released)

With John Dikeman
2014 - The Double Trio (Monofonus Press/Astral Spirits)

With Natural Information Society & Bitchin Bajas
2015 - Automaginary (Drag City)

With Ryley Walker
2015 - Primrose Green (Dead Oceans)
2016 - Golden Sings That Have Been Sung (Dead Oceans)

With Tim Stine Trio
2015 - Bios 1 (Self-Released)
2016 - Tim Stine Trio (Astral Spirits)

With Next Delusion
2015 - Next Delusion (Shameless)

With Hearts & Minds
2016 - Hearts & Minds (Astral Spirits)

With Josh Abrams & Natural Information Society
2017 - Simultonality (Eremite)

References

External links
Frank Rosaly Homepage
Molk Records

American jazz drummers
1974 births
Living people
Musicians from Phoenix, Arizona
Jazz musicians from Chicago
Puerto Rican jazz musicians
Musicians from Amsterdam
20th-century American drummers
American male jazz musicians
Northern Arizona University alumni
20th-century American male musicians
RogueArt artists